Girma (Ge'ez: ግርማ) is a male name of Ethiopian and Eritrean origin that may refer to:

Girma (Tigray dynasty), 16th-century ruler of Welayta
Girma Ashenafi (born 1982), Ethiopian footballer
Girma Asmerom. Eritrean diplomat
Girma Bekele Gebre (born 1992), Ethiopian runner
Girma Bèyènè, Ethiopian composer and musician
Girma Berhanu (born 1960), Ethiopian runner
Girma Tolla (born 1975), Ethiopian long-distance runner
Girma Wolde-Giorgis (born 1924), President of Ethiopia (2001–2013)
Girma Yohannis Iyasu (born 1961), Iyasuist claimant to the throne of Ethiopia
Adane Girma (born 1985), Ethiopian footballer
Alula Girma (born 1993), Ethiopian footballer
Berhanu Girma (born 1986), Ethiopian marathon runner
Chaltu Girma Meshesha (born 1985), birth name of Ethiopian-born long-distance runner for Turkey Sultan Haydar
Haben Girma (born 1988), deafblind lawyer
Muluemebet Girma (born 1984), from Stockwell, London, was the third person charged over the 21 July 2005 London bombings
Nahu Senay Girma, Ethiopian women's rights campaigner
Yeshshiemebet Girma (born 1977), the second person charged over the 21 July 2005 London bombings

See also 

 Girma

Amharic-language names